The 2021 Howard Bison men's soccer team represented Howard University during the 2021 NCAA Division I men's soccer season. They were led by seventh year head coach Phillip Gyau.

Roster 
The 2021-2022 roster for the Howard Men's Bison.

Players arriving 
Howard signed seven players during the 2021 recruiting period.

Player Statistics

Schedule 
August SeptemberOctoberNovember

References 

Howard Bison men's soccer seasons